The State Duma of the Federal Assembly of the Russian Federation of the 5th convocation (Russian: Государственная Дума Федерального Собрания Российской Федерации V созыва) is a former convocation of the legislative branch of the State Duma, lower house of the Russian Parliament. The 5th convocation met at the State Duma building in Moscow, worked from December 24, 2007 to December 21, 2011.

The 5th State Duma's composition was based upon the results of the 2007 parliamentary election. Of the eleven parties participating in the elections, only four were able to overcome the 7% election threshold to gain representation based upon the proportional representation system.

Leadership

On December 24, 2007, the parliament re-elected Boris Gryzlov from the United Russia as the Chairman of the State Duma.

At the same time, according to tradition, until the election of the Chairman of the State Duma, the meeting carried the oldest members of the State Duma – 77 year-old of Zhores Alferov (from Communist Party).

Factions

Major legislation

 May 8, 2008: Vladimir Putin approved as Prime Minister of Russia with 392 votes in favor.
 November 21, 2008: Approved amendments to the Constitution of Russia with 392 votes in favor.

Committees
In the State Duma of the 5th convocation operated 33 Committees.

Committee on Constitutional Legislation and State Building
Committee on Civil, Criminal, Arbitration and Procedural Law
Veterans Affairs Committee
Committee of Labour and Social Policy
Budget and Tax Committee
Financial Market Committee
Committee on Economic Policy and Entrepreneurship
Committee on Property Issues
Committee on Information Policy, Information Technology and Communications
Committee on Energy
Committee on Transport
Land Relations Committee and construction
Industry Committee
Committee on Science and High Technology
Education Committee
Committee on Culture
Physical Culture and Sports Committee
Youth Committee
Health Protection Committee
Committee on Women, Family and Children
Committee on Agrarian Issues
Defence Committee
Safety Committee
Committee on International Affairs
Committee on Commonwealth of Independent States Affairs and Relations with Compatriots
Committee on Rules and Organization of the State Duma
Committee on the problems of the North and Far East
Committee on Federation Affairs and Regional Policy 
Committee on Local Government 
The Environmental Committee
Committee on Natural Resources and the Environment
Committee on Public Associations and Religious Organizations
Committee for Nationalities

References

Convocations of the Russian State Duma
5th State Duma of the Russian Federation